Allium sannineum (Arabic ثوم صنين) is a plant species found in the Levant (Syria, Israel, Palestine, Jordan and Lebanon). It is a bulb-forming perennial with an umbel of flowers crowded together, resembling a head. Their tepals are deep blue of violet with fringed edges.

They can found at elevations between 1800–2300 m.

References

sannineum
Onions
Flora of Palestine (region)
Flora of Lebanon and Syria
Plants described in 1938